Lose Your Way is the second studio album by the British rock band Love Amongst Ruin. It was released by Ancient B Records on 29 June 2015 and has been described as "an album from an artist over the hump, head high to the future and all engines gunning".

Background

Writing and recording 
Writing for Love Amongst Ruin's second album began midway through the tour supporting their self-titled debut album in January 2011. Just prior to the end of the tour the following June, frontman Steve Hewitt revealed that the band had written nine songs and planned to begin recording in September 2011. In November, Hewitt revealed that the band had been recording at Moles Studio in Bath, the location of the majority of recording for the band's debut album. Writing was completed in March 2012 and recordings continued at Moles Studio, with Hewitt and guitarists Donald Ross Skinner and Steve Hove handling playing duties, with Paul Corkett engineering. Corkett later put Hewitt and Skinner in touch with producer Dan Austin, a frequent production partner of Gil Norton. Austin was given a trial run at producing the title track, which he "nailed" and was asked to produce the whole album. The entire process was completed in two-and-a-half months.

Perry Bamonte featured on bass on the album after being announced as having joined the band in September 2012. Early composition "Oh God" was recorded for the album, after having been performed live at the London Scala in June 2010 and prepared for an EP in 2012, which failed to see release. A cover of Six by Seven's "So Close" was recorded for the album, prior to Hewitt joining the said band in 2013. Despite initially not wishing to record a cover, Hewitt and Austin felt the track fitted the vibe of the album and set out "to make it the song it never really was". Former member Laurie Ross returned to provide cello and programming for the album. Hewitt recalled that the troublesome vocal melody for "Menace Ballad" was completed by local Bath musician Nick Walker.

Musical style and influences 
The album has been described as containing rock noir, psychedelic, experimental post-rock and ethereal influences.

Themes 
Of the album's title and title track, Hewitt said "it’s how your perceptions change as you go through life. Do you actually know where you’re fucking going? It’s trying to explain life’s difficult path". Hewitt also revealed that he consciously made a decision to write about experiences outside the personal nature prevalent on the debut album, saying "it's a difficult thing to do and a huge departure mentally and it's something I find exciting. There are still personal songs on the record, but it's more about the human condition rather than what's being inflicted by others". Closing track "Oh God" was written by Hewitt as a reaction to the shock of hearing the news of the death of his friend Stuart Cable in 2010. "Modern War Song" deals with the subject of Western imperialism and how "revolting soldiers are treated when their service finishes after signing up and fighting for their country". Hewitt revealed that there isn't a constant theme running through the album, instead "the album is more of a soundscape".

Delay and release 
Lose Your Way was put on the back burner after guitarist Steve Hove quit the band shortly before a comeback show at the London Barfly on 10 September 2012. Hewitt subsequently joined Six by Seven for its Love and Peace and Sympathy album and tour in 2013 and produced records by former Love Amongst Ruin opening bands Lys and Spiral 69. The Lose Your Way album title and track list were revealed in April 2015, with a release date of 29 June 2015. The release of the album was preceded by the "Lose Your Way" EP on 11 May 2015 and was followed by the "Modern War Song" and "So Close" EPs respectively on 24 July and 6 November. By April 2021, the album had gone silver.

Reception

NME gave the album 7/10, saying that the album was "lovely, but ruinous". Cryptic Rock gave the album full marks and said Hewitt had achieved a "smorgasbord" and "cornucopia of sound". Kerrang! awarded the album 4/5, saying Hewitt's ejection from Placebo "may well have been a blessing in disguise".

Track listing

iTunes bonus tracks

Personnel 
 Steve Hewitt – vocals, drums, bass, guitar, piano
 Donald Ross Skinner – guitar, bass, keyboards
 Steve Hove – guitar
 Laurie Ross – cello, programming
 Beth Porter – cello
 James SK Wān – glockenspiel
 Perry Bamonte – bass

Production 
 Production, engineering – Dan Austin
 Additional engineering – Paul Corkett
 Mixing – Dan Austin, Steve Hewitt, Donald Ross Skinner
 Mastering – Brian Gardner
 Additional mastering – Paul Walton

Tour

On 3 September 2015, Love Amongst Ruin announced a European tour to support Lose Your Way. The tour included the band's debut shows in Austria, Slovenia, Croatia, Norway and Sweden. Gizz Butt (guitar) and Ravi Kesavaram (drums) were brought in to support the core lineup of Hewitt, Skinner and Bamonte. An instrumental version of the off-album track "Amy's Prayer" was used as the band's walk-on music.

Cancelled dates

1 Cancelled due to circumstances beyond the band's control.

EPs 
 2015: "Lose Your Way" (11 May 2015)
 2015: "Modern War Song" (23 July 2015)
 2015: "So Close" (6 November 2015)

References 

2015 albums
Love Amongst Ruin albums
Albums produced by Dan Austin